Merton of the Movies is a 1947 American comedy film, based on the 1922 novel of the same name written by Harry Leon Wilson, and the play of the same name written by George S. Kaufmann and Marc Connelly, which opened on Broadway in 1922. It was previously adapted as a 1924 silent film and as the 1932 film Make Me a Star. The 1947 version stars Red Skelton and is directed by choreographer Robert Alton in his directorial debut.

Cast

Production 
Due to negative reception from sneak preview audiences, extensive reshoots were required before a widespread release.

Reception
According to MGM records the movie earned $1,274,000 in the US and Canada and $438,000 elsewhere, making a loss to the studio of $367,000.

Comic book adaptation
 Fiction House Movie Comics #4 (1947)

References

External links

Merton of the Movies at TCMDB

1947 films
1947 romantic comedy films
American romantic comedy films
American black-and-white films
Remakes of American films
1947 directorial debut films
Films about actors
Films about filmmaking
Films about Hollywood, Los Angeles
Films based on American novels
Films set in 1915
Films set in Los Angeles
Metro-Goldwyn-Mayer films
Films with screenplays by George Wells
Films adapted into comics
Sound film remakes of silent films
1940s English-language films
1940s American films